Yof Bay is a bay on the north side of the Cap-Vert peninsula, directly north of the city centre of Dakar, Senegal. It stretches southwest from the town Kayar to Yoff, a suburb of Dakar. The bay opens towards the north and lies in the area of the westernmost point of Africa. Small Île de Yoff lies in the NW corner of the bay.

Further reading
 Les Yoffois et leur environnement naturel : pêche, agriculture et territoire. in  Richard Dumez and Moustapha Kâ. Yoff Le Territoire Assiégé: Un village lébou dans la banlieue de Dakar. Dossiers régions côtières et petites îles 7.  Unesco (2000)

References

Dakar
Bays of Senegal